HC Keski-Uusimaa known as HCK is a Finnish ice hockey team based in Kerava, Finland.  The team was founded in 2008 and began play in the Suomi-sarja, the third level of hockey in Finland, before being promoted to the Mestis for the 2012–13 season.

In their first season in Mestis they finished 12th and lost to K-Vantaa in the playouts, but won their way out of being relegated back to Suomi-sarja by accumulating a 5 win, 1 overtime win, 0 loss record against RoKi, KeuPa HT, and Pyry Nokia from the Suomi-sarja in the qualification round.

Current roster

Updated December 16, 2013

|}

History

Season by season record

Retired numbers
#22 Joakim Roslund

Franchise records

References

External links
HCK on Eliteprospects.com
Official Website (Finnish)

Kerava
Ice hockey clubs established in 2008
2008 establishments in Finland
Mestis teams
Ice hockey teams in Finland